Gaston Amson (17 November 1883 – 16 July 1960) was a French fencer. He won a silver and a bronze medal at the 1920 Summer Olympics and a silver at the 1928 Summer Olympics.

References

External links
 

1883 births
1960 deaths
French male épée fencers
French male foil fencers
Olympic fencers of France
Fencers at the 1920 Summer Olympics
Fencers at the 1928 Summer Olympics
Olympic silver medalists for France
Olympic bronze medalists for France
Olympic medalists in fencing
Fencers from Paris
Medalists at the 1920 Summer Olympics
Medalists at the 1928 Summer Olympics
20th-century French people